"Leader of the Pack" is a song written by George "Shadow" Morton, Jeff Barry, and Ellie Greenwich. It was a number one pop hit in 1964 for the American girl group the Shangri-Las. The single is one of the group's best known songs as well as a popular cultural example of a "teenage tragedy song". The song was covered in 1985 by the heavy metal band Twisted Sister, who had a more modest hit with their version (no. 57 in the US).

Background and composition

The tune of "Leader of the Pack" is credited to pop impresario George "Shadow" Morton together with Jeff Barry and Ellie Greenwich. According to Morton, he wrote the song for the Goodies (also known as the Bunnies), but instead it was needed as a follow-up to the Shangri-Las hit "Remember (Walking in the Sand)".

Lyrical content
The song is about a girl named Betty, who is asked by friends to confirm that she is dating Jimmy, the leader of a motorcycle gang, whose ring they see on Betty's finger. After singing of love at first sight ("(By the way, where'd you meet him?)  I met him at the candy store/He turned around and smiled at me/You get the picture?/(Yes, we see)  That's when I fell for the Leader of the Pack"), Betty's heart turns to despair as she bemoans her parents' disapproval. The parents claim Jimmy hails from "the wrong side of town" and ask Betty to tell Jimmy goodbye and find someone new. Betty reluctantly does as she is asked, and a crushed and tearful Jimmy speeds off on his motorcycle. Moments later, Betty's pleas for Jimmy to slow down are in vain as Jimmy crashes on a rain-slicked surface and dies.

The Shangri-Las original version

Recording
In July 1964, Morton recorded the vocals for "Leader of the Pack" with the Shangri-Las at Mira Sound Studios located on 145 West 47th street on the second floor of a Manhattan hotel. The song was produced by Morton. These vocals were dubbed over the instrumental parts, which had been previously recorded at the Ultrasonic Recording Studios in Hempstead, New York. Billy Joel, then a young session musician, said on November 16, 2010 during an interview with Howard Stern that he played piano on one of the demos for "Leader of the Pack," but he was not sure if any of his parts made the final recording. In fact, the piano part was played by Roger Rossi, a staff musician for Ultrasonic Recording Studios at the time. Rossi said, "I remember the date like it was yesterday, there were no written charts, so unfortunately, some musicians kept making mistakes. As I recall, it took 63 recording takes before Shadow Morton was satisfied." Rossi added, "By the end of the session, in take 62, I also messed up and Morton laughingly yelled out, 'Ohhhh, noooo. Not you, too!'" 

In 2007 Tony Visconti wrote that pianist Artie Butler played on the track.

To add the authentic sound of a motorcycle engine, one was reportedly driven through the lobby of the hotel and up to the floor of the recording studio. No one was arrested, but a ticket was issued. The motorcycle belonged to the assistant engineer on the session, who was Joe Venneri. However, in an interview four decades later, Shangri-Las lead singer Mary Weiss said the motorcycle sound was taken from an effects record. Hugh Grundy, drummer for The Zombies, revved up a motorcycle backstage when the Shangri-Las performed on a US tour.

Reception
"Leader of the Pack" was released as a single by Red Bird Records, a Leiber and Stoller label, and the song hit number one on the Billboard Hot 100 on November 28, 1964. 
On Cashbox's R&B chart, it went to number 8.
In the United Kingdom, the single was refused airplay by the BBC, probably due to its death theme, although some have speculated that it was considered likely to encourage violence between mods and rockers. It charted three times on the UK Singles Chart: number 11 in 1965; number 3 in 1972 (by which time the BBC ban had been lifted); and once again at number 7 in 1976, when its sales figures as a reissue on two different labels (Charly and Contempo) were combined to arrive at its chart position. The record also reached number 1 in Australia.

Cash Box described it as "a heartbreaking cha cha thumper about a gal in love with the 'Leader Of The Pack'—who loses his life in a cycle crash" with "sensational vocal and instrumental sounds" and a "powerhouse" production."  In 2004, Rolling Stone ranked the song among the 500 Greatest Songs of All Time at number 447.  In the 2010 revision of the list, it was moved to number 454 as new entries were added. In the 2021 update, it was moved to number 315. Billboard named the song #9 on their list of 100 Greatest Girl Group Songs of All Time.  In 2019, the song was inducted into the Rock and Roll Hall of Fame under the new singles category created in 2018.

The song appeared in a Broadway musical based on the songs of Ellie Greenwich, Leader of the Pack, which opened in 1985. In 1990, the song was used in the Martin Scorsese film, Goodfellas.

Chart performance

Twisted Sister version

Recording
In 1985, the heavy metal band Twisted Sister recorded a cover version of "Leader of the Pack" from the eponymous leader's perspective, where it is the female lover that was in a car accident, although, in the video, she does not die. The track was included on the group's fourth studio album Come Out and Play. It was released as the album's first single and was issued on Atlantic Records. The song charted at number 53 on the Billboard Hot 100 chart and reached number 47 on the UK Singles chart. In Canada in bubbled on the RPM Top Singles chart peaking at number 80. In New Zealand the single reached number 45.

Other versions
 On her debut album The Divine Miss M, Bette Midler did a version which began in the original tempo, sped up in the second verse, and was so fast by the end that it became difficult to understand the lyrics. Midler later covered the opening track of the Leader of the Pack album "Give Him a Great Big Kiss" on her 2014 album It's The Girls!
 French singer Frank Alamo (1942–2012) recorded this song in French in 1965 as "Le chef de la bande".
 New Zealand group When the Cat's Away released a version as their debut single.
 In the U.S. television series American Dreams, the song was performed by Hilary and Haylie Duff, acting as members of the Shangri-Las.
 In the 2006 movie Happy Feet, it was sung by the character Néstor, with a sad rhythm quite different from the original.
 The Portsmouth Sinfonia covered the song on their 1980 album 20 Classic Rock Classics. It is the only track on the album with vocals.
 Alvin and the Chipmunks did a cover version, changing "Jimmy" to "Alvin". On the album Chipmunk Rock, the Chipmunks are portrayed as the girls. This is also the first Chipmunks song to mention the Chipettes by group name.
 Estonian singer Margit Viirma recorded a cover version of the song in 2009, entitled "Jõugu liider".
 Seventies pop duo, The Carpenters, did a cover of the song on their first live album, Live In Japan. They performed it as part of an oldies medley in most of their concerts from 1973–1975.
 A version of it is performed in the musical The Marvelous Wonderettes.

Parodies
 In 1965, "Leader of the Laundromat", written by Paul Vance and Lee Pockriss, was released by The Detergents. This resulted in Morton, Barry and Greenwich filing a lawsuit for plagiarism. This parody was a favorite of Dr. Demento.
 The Downliners Sect also released a parody on their 1965 "Sect Sing Sick Songs" EP called "Leader of the Sect."
 Also in 1965, the parody "I Want My Baby Back" was released by Jimmy Cross. In 1977, this was awarded the title of "The World's Worst Record" by British radio DJ Kenny Everett.
 In 1977, EMI records released "Packer of the Leads (Leader of the Pack)" by The Roadies (Lewis 'n Luce) in the UK.
 In the 1982 musical Little Shop of Horrors, Ronette, one of the backup singers, says "Here he is, girls, the Leader of The Plaque" during the song "Dentist". Orin, the dentist, notably rides a motorcycle that sounds similar to that in the song.
 "Jonny Don't Go", from the 1993 musical Zombie Prom, is melodically similar to, and likely a parody of, "Leader of the Pack". The song centers around Toffee, a high school senior whose parents forbid her from seeing her boyfriend Jonny because they believe him to be "no good" and force her to break up with him. She reluctantly does so, and Jonny immediately throws himself into a nuclear power plant, despite Toffee's pleas for him to stop.
 British comedian Julian Clary sang a parody of "Leader of the Pack" in 1988–90 as part of his then-act, The Joan Collins Fanclub. It was released as a single in the UK and reached a peak position of No.60 on the UK singles chart in the summer of 1988. Clary sang the lead part from the point of view of a camp 28-year-old gay man bewailing the loss of his biker love interest in a fatal motorcycle accident.
 Bob Rivers also did a parody of "Leader of the Pack" which is called 'Leader of Iraq'. The song was centered around the execution of former president of Iraq Saddam Hussein. 
 The tune was used by the political satire group The Capitol Steps for their song "A Leader Like Barack", about Barack Obama.
 A parody version of the song ("Our leader is Lurpak") was used in a claymation TV advertisement for Lurpak butter in the UK.
 In 2009, the BBC produced a trailer for the children's TV show Shaun the Sheep as a parody of the song called "Leader of the Flock".
 Gilda Radner, Jane Curtin, and Laraine Newman did a song entitled "Chevy, Chevy" on an episode of Saturday Night Live, which has a spoken part very similar to the one in this song. Sonic the Hedgehog  and Touhou Project fans have made their own parodies of aftermentioned SNL song.
British punk rock group The Damned quoted the first line of the song ("Is she really going out with him?") in their single "New Rose".

See also
 Teenage tragedy song

References

External links
 History of the Shangri-Las

1964 songs
1964 singles
1985 singles
Songs written by Ellie Greenwich
Songs written by Jeff Barry
The Shangri-Las songs
Teenage tragedy songs
Vehicle wreck ballads
Billboard Hot 100 number-one singles
Cashbox number-one singles
Songs written by Shadow Morton
Alvin and the Chipmunks songs
Red Bird Records singles
Twisted Sister songs
Atlantic Records singles
Songs banned by the BBC